Shuna may refer to:

Places
Shuna, Slate Islands, at the northern end of the Sound of Jura, Scotland
Shuna Island, in Loch Linnhe, offshore from Appin, Scotland

Arabic placenames
Al-Shuna
North Shuna
South Shuna

Human name
Shuna Scott Sendall, Scottish opera singer
Shuna Harwood, British costume designer
Jiāng Shúnà or Chiang Shu-na, Taiwanese singer, television presenter, and actress

Fictional characters

Shuna, an ogre princess in list of That Time I Got Reincarnated as a Slime characters
Shuna Sakakibara, a character from NG Life manga
Shuna in list of Elfquest characters

Other
SS Shuna, a Glasgow steamer, see Sound of Mull

See also

The Journey of Shuna, a manga by Hayao Miyazaki
Sound of Shuna, a vessel of Western Ferries